Ken Bracewell (born 5 October 1936) is an English former professional football player and coach. Bracewell, who played as a full-back, made over 200 league appearances in England, Canada, and the United States.

Playing career
Born in Colne, Lancashire, Bracewell began his career in non-league football with Trawden. He then signed with league club Burnley, but never made a league appearance, and so made his professional debut with Tranmere Rovers in 1959, making 28 league appearances in two seasons. Bracewell then played non-league football with Nelson, and with Canadian side Toronto Italia, before returning to English league football with Norwich City. However, he didn't make a single appearance for Norwich, and soon signed for Lincoln City, where he made 23 league appearances between 1963 and 1965. After leaving Lincoln, Bracewell played non-league football with Margate, before signing with Bury, where he made one league appearance. Bracewell then spent two seasons in Canada with the Toronto Falcons, and returned briefly to England to play with Rochdale. Bracewell then returned to the NASL to play with the Atlanta Chiefs, the Atlanta Apollos and the Denver Dynamos.

Coaching career
During the 1973 and 1974 NASL seasons, Bracewell was player-coach of the Atlanta Apollos and the Denver Dynamos respectively. He was manager of the Oakland Stompers in the 1978 NASL season, and of the San Francisco Scots in 1983. He was briefly caretaker manager of hometown club Colne in 1996.

References

1936 births
Living people
People from Colne
English footballers
Association football fullbacks
English Football League players
Eastern Canada Professional Soccer League players
National Professional Soccer League (1967) players
North American Soccer League (1968–1984) players
Trawden F.C. players
Burnley F.C. players
Tranmere Rovers F.C. players
Nelson F.C. players
Toronto Italia players
Norwich City F.C. players
Lincoln City F.C. players
Margate F.C. players
Bury F.C. players
Toronto Falcons (1967–68) players
Rochdale A.F.C. players
Atlanta Chiefs players
Denver Dynamos players
English football managers
Association football player-managers
North American Soccer League (1968–1984) coaches
Atlanta Chiefs coaches
Denver Dynamos coaches
Oakland Stompers coaches
Colne F.C. managers
English expatriate footballers
English expatriate sportspeople in Canada
Expatriate soccer players in Canada
English expatriate sportspeople in the United States
Expatriate soccer players in the United States